The YIVO Encyclopedia of Jews in Eastern Europe is a two-volume, English-language reference work on the history and culture of Eastern Europe Jewry in this region, prepared by the YIVO Institute for Jewish Research and published by Yale University Press in 2008.

Print edition

The encyclopedia, 2,400 pages in length, contains over 1,800 alphabetical entries written by 450 contributors, and features over 1,000 illustrations and 55 maps.

Online edition
The online version of the Encyclopedia was officially launched June 10, 2010.  It's free to access online.

Awards and honors
Choice: Current Reviews for Academic Libraries Outstanding Academic Title 2008 
Recipient of the 2009 Dartmouth Medal Honorable Mention by the American Library Association.
Honorable Mention for the 2008 PROSE Award in the Multi-volume Reference/Humanities & Social Sciences category, from the Association of American Publishers
Winner of the 2008 Judaica Reference Award, given by the Association of Jewish Libraries

Editorial staff
Editor-in-Chief: Gershon David Hundert, McGill University 
Editorial Board:
Marion Aptroot, Heinrich Heine University, Düsseldorf
David Assaf, Tel Aviv University
Gershon Bacon, Bar-Ilan University
David Engel, New York University
Immanuel Etkes, Hebrew University of Jerusalem
Edward Fram, Ben Gurion University of the Negev
Michał T. Galas, Jagiellonian University
Haim Gertner, Hebrew University
Avraham Greenbaum, University of Haifa, Hebrew University
Ze'ev Gries, Ben Gurion University
Avner Holtzman, Tel Aviv University
Jack Jacobs, John Jay College, City University of New York
Samuel Kassow, Trinity College
Hillel J. Kieval, Washington University in St. Louis
Barbara Kirshenblatt-Gimblett, New York University
Mikhail Krutikov, University of Michigan
Dov Levin, Hebrew University
Olga Litvak, University at Albany
Rachel Manekin, University of Maryland, College Park
Alice Nakhimovsky, Colgate University
Magda Opalski, Victoria, British Columbia
Elchanan Reiner, Tel Aviv University
Yaakov Ro'i, Tel Aviv University
Michael K. Silber, Hebrew University
Mark Slobin, Wesleyan University
Shaul Stampfer, Hebrew University
Michael Stanislawski, Columbia University
Michael C. Steinlauf, Gratz College
Adam Teller, University of Haifa
Chava Turniansky, Hebrew University
Leon Volovici, Hebrew University
Chava Weissler, Lehigh University
Mordechai Zalkin, Ben Gurion University

See also
List of encyclopedias by branch of knowledge

References

Bibliography
 The YIVO Encyclopedia of Jews in Eastern Europe, ed. Gershon D. Hundert. New Haven: Yale University Press, 2008.

External links
The YIVO Encyclopedia of Jews in Eastern Europe

2008 non-fiction books
Jews in Eastern Europe
History of the Jews in Europe
Jewish encyclopedias
American online encyclopedias
Yale University Press books
21st-century encyclopedias